Aleksandr Vladimirovich Danishevsky (born 23 February 1984) is a Russian former professional footballer.

Club career
He made his debut in the Russian Premier League in 2001 for Spartak Moscow. He played 1 game for Spartak Moscow in the UEFA Champions League 2001–02, 6 games in the UEFA Champions League 2002–03 and 3 games in the UEFA Cup 2003–04. On 1 September 2014, he signed for FC SKChF Sevastopol, which plays in Zone South of the Russian Second Division.

Honours
 Russian Premier League champion: 2001.
 Russian Premier League bronze: 2002.
 Russian Cup winner: 2003.
 Russian Cup finalist: 2005.

References

External links
 
 

1984 births
Living people
Sportspeople from Sevastopol
Russian footballers
Russia youth international footballers
Russia under-21 international footballers
Association football forwards
Russian expatriate footballers
Expatriate footballers in Ukraine
Russian expatriate sportspeople in Ukraine
Expatriate footballers in Belarus
FC Spartak Moscow players
FC Khimki players
FC Torpedo Moscow players
FC Kuban Krasnodar players
FC Rostov players
FC Arsenal Kyiv players
FC Anzhi Makhachkala players
FC Zhemchuzhina Sochi players
FC Sevastopol players
FC Belshina Bobruisk players
FC Zirka Kropyvnytskyi players
Russian Premier League players
Ukrainian Premier League players
FC Sevastopol (Russia) players
FC Sportakademklub Moscow players